Spokane Black Widows were an American soccer team based in Spokane, Washington, United States. Founded in 2010, the team played in the Women's Premier Soccer League (WPSL), the second tier of the American Soccer Pyramid, in the North Division of the Pacific Conference.

The team played its home games at Joe Albi Stadium. The team's colors were blue, black and white.

Players

WPSL Honorable Mention for Player of the Week
  Tiara Pittman 6/21/10
  Kellie Zakrzewski 6/28/10

Year-by-year

Pacific Conference - North Division

Head coaches
  Jason Quintero (2010)

Stadia
 Joe Albi Stadium; Spokane, Washington (2010)

Average attendance

References

External links
Official Site
Official WPSL site

Association football clubs established in 2010
Women's Premier Soccer League teams
Women's soccer clubs in Washington (state)
Sports in Spokane, Washington
2010 establishments in Washington (state)